is the 13th single released by Japanese pop duo Puffy AmiYumi.  Puffy's first 21st century single was produced by Andy Sturmer and recorded in L.A.. It was used in the commercial starring the artists themselves. It includes 'Love So Pure', an English-language version of 'Sumire' whose original version was included in their 2000 album 'Spike'.

List of songs
 Atarashii Hibi
 Tomodachi (Friends)
 Love so Pure
 Atarashii Hibi (Original Karaoke)

Featured
This song was featured on the compilation album Japan For Sale Vol.2

References

Puffy AmiYumi songs
2001 singles
2001 songs